The Academy of United States Veterans (AUSV) is a professional honorary organization with the stated goal of advancing the profile of organizations and programs that help serve the veterans community. AUSV brings a sense of collaboration and unity to the community of the armed forces and their families. AUSV is a vehicle in bringing real opportunities to veterans and veteran service organizations encouraging creativity and cooperation that creates a new narrative for veterans and for all Americans. AUSV promotes community unity as a tribute to the strength and preference of people for inclusion and partnership over division and alienation.

AUSV is known for its annual Veterans Awards also knowns as the Vettys.

The organization came under close scrutiny by the Veteran community after an article in Task and Purpose found that there was no real impact in the veteran community and employees "had no idea" what the organization really did.

Accusations of Impropriety
In an Article dated December 3, 2021 by Task and Purpose, 

https://taskandpurpose.com/news/vetty-awards/

One former employee was quoted in saying “After working there for six months, I still don’t know what the non-profit does to help veterans,”

Multiple current and former employees told Task & Purpose, "they labored through internal chaos for an organization with sometimes questionable financial practices, and whose actual impact on the veterans’ community appears to be dubious."

Former employee Connor Dalton stated "extreme outbursts resulted in many of the staff complaining of a hostile work environment". 

"Veterans’ advocates, philanthropy experts, and 17 former employees say the Vettys and AUSV have skirted charity best practices and, often served as a vehicle for its founder to burnish her public profile."

Stephanie Kalivas, an analyst at the non-profit watchdog group CharityWatch, described some of AUSV’s activity detailed in this story as “highly suspicious.” She also raised red flags and potential conflicts of interest over the information provided in the non-profit’s public disclosures, some of which could incur penalties from various bodies that regulate nonprofits. “[Ravandi] doesn’t seem like she’s on top of what she should be doing,” Kalivas said. 

While six years old, AUSV has only offered detailed financial information for one year — 2019 — even as its finances likely mandated more public reporting. Unlike many non-profits, AUSV also doesn’t release donor information or annual reports. 

AUSV is technically composed of two separate entities: a 501(c)(6) called the Academy of United States Veterans and a related 501(c)(4): the Academy of United States Veterans Foundation. 

The foundation emerged first, in 2017. For 2017 and 2018, the foundation didn’t file exhaustive 990 reports but rather “e-Postcards,” which provide little information and are only permitted for groups that receive less than $50,000 annually. Yet the organization didn’t qualify for these limited disclosure requirements. Ravandi herself said the foundation brought in more than $500,000 in its maiden year. (AUSV’s website lists at least $65,000 in donations made by the foundation to other non-profits in 2017.

AUSV is technically composed of two separate entities: a 501(c)(6) called the Academy of United States Veterans and a related 501(c)(4): the Academy of United States Veterans Foundation. 

The foundation emerged first, in 2017. For 2017 and 2018, the foundation didn’t file exhaustive 990 reports but rather “e-Postcards,” which provide little information and are only permitted for groups that receive less than $50,000 annually. Yet the organization didn’t qualify for these limited disclosure requirements. 

Ravandi herself said the foundation brought in more than $500,000 in its maiden year. (AUSV’s website lists at least $65,000 in donations made by the foundation to other non-profits in 2017.)

Founding and objective 
AUSV was founded by United States Army Afghanistan War combat veteran, Assal Ravandi to create opportunities for community unity and empowerment. The organization is based in Arlington, VA. Its programs include non-partisan community and social advocacy through its various partnerships and collaboration with the arts and entertainment communities.

Events 
AUSV hosted its first ever Veterans Awards in 2015 at The George Washington University.

The second annual Veterans Awards hosted by AUSV was organized in conjunction with a non-partisan inaugural ball on January 20, 2017.

The third annual Veterans Awards hosted by AUSV was held at the Mayflower Hotel in Washington, D.C.

The fourth annual Veterans Awards hosted by AUSV was held at the Watergate Hotel in Washington, D.C.

The seventh annual Veterans Awards to be hosted by AUSV in Las Vegas, Nevada.

References 

American veterans' organizations